Goosefoots (Chenopodium spp.) are used as food plants by the larvae of a large number of Lepidoptera species:

Monophagous
Species which feed exclusively on goosefoots

Coleophoridae
 Several Coleophora case-bearer species:
 C. binotapennella
 C. clypeiferella – feeds only on white goosefoot (C. album)
 C. mausolella
 C. unipunctella

Polyphagous
Species which feed on goosefoots and other plants

Coleophoridae
 Several Coleophora case-bearer species:
 C. annulatella
 C. lineapulvella – recorded on white goosefoot (C. album)
 C. saxicolella
 C. scaleuta
 C. sternipennella
 C. versurella
Crambidae
 Loxostege sticticalis – recorded on white goosefoot (C. album)
Gelechiidae
 Chrysoesthia drurella
Geometridae
 Plain pug, Eupithecia simpliciata
Noctuidae
 Heart and club, Agrotis clavis
 Nutmeg, Discestra trifolii
 Orache moth, Trachea atriplicis

External links

Chenopodium
+Lepidoptera